Common Kings are an American, Hawaiian, and Samoan reggae band from Orange County, California. The band's debut album, Lost in Paradise, was nominated for a Grammy Award.

History

Formation (2011)
Born in the South Pacific and raised in Orange County, California the members of Common Kings which consists of 'Jr. King' (Sasualei Maliga) on lead vocals, 'Mata' (Taumata Grey) on guitar, 'Uncle Lui' (Ivan Kirimaua) on bass, and 'Big Rome' (Jerome Taito) on drums, formed after forging a bond from a jam session at Ivan's house.

Originally from Hawaii with Samoan roots, Sasualei Maliga, who has a three-octave range voice, met drummer Jerome Taito (from Tonga), bassist Ivan Kirimaua (from Fiji/Kirimaua) and guitarist Taumata Grey (from Samoa) when they were growing up in the Orange County towns of Costa Mesa, Garden Grove, and Irvine, all through a close-knit O.C. Pacific-Islander community. The four met in 2002 during a barbecue at Kirimaua's beachfront house in Newport Beach, California.

They formed the band while studying at Orange Coast College in Costa Mesa, California, and began recording songs in 2011.

The band name pays tribute to their proud heritage and the love for their home lands of Fiji, Hawaii, Samoa, and Tonga where their ancestry comes from royalty. So all members have ruling-class bloodlines. But they remind us that they're just "everyday guys" from Orange County, California living out their humble dreams. Common Kings developed a style of reggae with hints of rock and an island sound. Their songs feature an array of "head-rocking beats, feel good vibes, and emotional fever."

EPs and Touring (2013–2014)
After releasing two EPs in 2013; #Weontour Soundtrack on July 20 and Summer Anthems on August 13 (both of which were top ten hits on the Billboard Reggae Albums chart), Singles, "Alcoholic" and "Wade in Your Water" from Summer Anthems were the first to hit Hawaiian radio.

Common Kings toured Australia and New Zealand as a support act on Justin Timberlake's 'The 20/20 Experience World Tour' in 2014.

Hits & Mrs. (2015)
The band signed to Island Empire Records, who issued the EP Hits & Mrs. on October 9, 2015 peaked at #2 on the Billboard Top Reggae Albums chart.

Lost in Paradise (2017)
Their debut album Lost in Paradise, released on February 3, 2017, received a Grammy Award nomination in the Best Reggae Album category, and topped the Billboard Top Reggae Albums chart.

One Day EP (2018)
The band's fourth EP, One Day, which was released on August 10, 2018 on Mensch House Records reached #2 on the Billboard charts for Top Reggae Albums.

Common Kings was featured as one of many reggae bands on Collie Buddz riddim album, Cali Roots Riddim 2020 with their single, "There I Go", which was produced by Buddz and mixed by Stick Figure's touring guitarist, producer Johnny Cosmic.

In 2021, Common Kings was one of several reggae and punk bands on The House That Bradley Built, a charity compilation honoring Sublime's lead singer Bradley Nowell, helping musicians with substance abuse. They covered Sublime's song "Garden Grove", the first track on the album.

Musical Influences
Common Kings sound is mixing catchy beats into pop music hits that's infused with the members' love of reggae, rock, R&B and island music. Through individually different musical influences, the members came together with their own unique styles from artists and bands such as, Bob Marley, Earth Wind and Fire, Gypsy Kings, Geourge Benson, Jim Croce, Led Zeppelin, Michael Jackson, Stevie Wonder, Van Morrison, and The Who to name a few.

Other Projects
Common Kings teamed up with SHR Productions to collaborate on a short sleeve button down shirt and package called the "Aloha-Bro". It's available in limited quantities (50 black shirts and 50 white shirts). In order to keep the "aloha spirit flowing", every order comes with free items, which include Common Kings One Day and Lost In Paradise CD's, a Common Kings die cut decal, and 2 SRH stickers.

Discography

Studio albums

EPs

Singles

Lineup

Current band members

Jr. King (Sasualei Maliga) – Vocals
Mata (Taumata Grey) – Guitar
Uncle Lui (Ivan Kirimaua) – Bass 
Big Rome (Jerome Taito) – Drums

References

External links

Musical groups from California
American reggae musical groups